The Said Halim Pasha cabinet was headed by Grand Vizier Said Halim Pasha. It was formed on 17 June 1913 after Mahmud Shevket Pasha's assassination. It soon came to be wholly controlled by the Union and Progress Party. With the exception of Mardikyan Bey being the only Christian, everyone in cabinet was Muslim, with Said Halim Pasha and his brother Abbas Pasha Arabs and the rest Turks.

Said Halim's government was under the influence of Talaat Bey, Enver Pasha, and Cemal Pasha. While Said Halim negotiated a secret alliance with the German Empire, Enver and Talaat engineered the Ottoman Empire's entry into the First World War. This caused four ministers to tender their resignations.

On 3 February 1917, Said Halim resigned due to "health concerns" and Talaat Bey was appointed Grand Vizier the next day.

References 

Committee of Union and Progress
1913 establishments in the Ottoman Empire
1917 disestablishments in the Ottoman Empire